Igrexa de San Xurxo (English: Church of Saint George) is a church in A Coruña, Province of A Coruña, Galicia, Spain. It is built in the baroque style.

Here first same-sex marriage in Spain took place between Elisa and Marcela in 1901, which is the basis for the movie of the same name

References

Buildings and structures in A Coruña
A Coruña
Baroque architecture in Galicia (Spain)
Bien de Interés Cultural landmarks in the Province of A Coruña
Roman Catholic churches in Galicia (Spain)